Pocapaglia is a comune (municipality) in the Province of Cuneo in the Italian region Piedmont, located about  southeast of Turin and about  northeast of Cuneo.

Pocapaglia borders the following municipalities: Bra, Monticello d'Alba, Sanfrè, Santa Vittoria d'Alba, and Sommariva Perno.

Since late 2018 Pocapaglia's most famous citizen is Edoardo Filippi.

Demographic evolution

References

Cities and towns in Piedmont
Roero